Kehne Ko Humsafar Hain is an Indian Hindi web series produced by Shristi Arya Behl and Goldie Behl for Ekta Kapoor's video on demand platforms ZEE5 and ALTBalaji. The series stars actors Ronit Roy, Mona Singh, and Gurdeep Kohli.

The series was launched on Zee TV on 25 March 2020 as a substitute for the Zee TV shows whose broadcast had to be stopped by the channel due to the COVID-19 pandemic.

Plot

Season 1
Rohit Mehra, a chartered accountant is married to Poonam for twenty-two years and have two daughters named Bani and Nikki. On the surface, they are a happy couple. But Rohit has an affair with Ananya Sharma, an interior designer. They meet privately and carefully keep their relationship under wraps. However, the secret is soon discovered. The family is torn apart, and Rohit's kids start loathing Ananya. Torn between a loyal wife and lover, Rohit decides to divorce Poonam and legitimize his relationship with Ananya through marriage. After several arguments, Rohit and Poonam are legally separated, and he marries Ananya.

Shortly after her marriage, Bani, Rohit's elder daughter hits depression due to her unhappiness in her marital life. Rohit goes back to his family to extend his support to his daughter through this difficult phase. This makes Ananya insecure, leading to everyday chaos at home. She feels neglected by Rohit who is still deeply connected with his former wife and children. Upset at the turn of events, she writes a letter for Rohit and leaves the house.

Season 2
Upon reading Ananya's letter, Rohit feels betrayed as he had left his family for her. He goes out on a search and fails to locate her. Soon, he learns that she is in Doha, and immediately takes off to make it up to her. After several tries, he convinces her to come back to India, where they set up a new life together. Everything goes back to normal again. However, Rohit's first wife Poonam starts dating a young man named Abhimanyu.

In subsequent episodes, Bani realizes that she had never loved her husband and wants to divorce him. Meanwhile Rohit hits a financial crisis but keeps Ananya out of the matter. Ananya learns of this through Poonam who unintentionally spills it out. She feels hurt that Rohit never felt comfortable to share his troubles with her.  On the other hand, Poonam  is uncomfortable with the love she is receiving from Abhimanyu. She is going through a difficult period of having a menopause, which has made her emotionally unstable. Eventually she comes to Rohit for help, and they end up having a one-night stand. Poonam tells Rohit not to let Ananya know of the incident, as she would be very  upset and end their relationship.

On Christmas Eve, a pregnant Ananya discovers the truth at a party. Rohit tries to explain, but a furious Ananya is adamant. She decides to not disclose to Rohit about her pregnancy, and immediately leaves for Doha, heartbroken.

Season 3
It has been four years since Ananya left Rohit. She has a three-year-old son, Kabir and still lives in Qatar. Meanwhile, Rohit has turned into a drunkard and philanderer. 

One day, Ananya learns that  her company in India, which she had given to Bani has hit a rough patch. She comes back to India and after a confrontation with Bani, decides to fix the issue with her. She meets everyone, including Rohit, that leads to an altercation. She makes up her mind for divorce but Rohit bluntly refuses.

Rohit and Poonam's younger daughter Nikki's marriage gets fixed. On the day of the wedding, the police arrives at the venue and arrests Rohit for allegedly kidnapping a lady' young daughter, who turns out to be the girl he is dating. Everyone tries to get him out of jail in time for the wedding, but the police refuses to give him bail. On the day of Nikki's marriage, Rohit confesses to his family that he had indeed married the girl he was dating. Everyone is shocked. Ananya feels sad and wants to leave.

Next morning, the daughter's mother comes to arrest Rohit again. She tells her daughter that the couple cannot be married since Rohit is her sister's husband. It is revealed that the woman is Ananya's mother, who had left her in a foster home when she was a baby. Her mother provided a huge amount of money to pay for Ananya's expenses but never met her. Ananya lived her life alone without parents and siblings which is why she has been so broken. The girl, in front of everyone, accepts that Rohit helped her in this matter because he loves Ananya so much. And that she and Rohit were not married. She then leaves.

Ananya misses her flight and decides to live in India with her family. She goes to meet Rohit with her son Kabir. He apologizes for everything and wants another chance, but she refuses to reconcile.

At last, they get divorced. After separation, Rohit comes to meet her. In a flashback, she says "I don't want my husband back. I want the man I love, Rohit, when we had great loving memories".

Cast
 Ronit Roy as Rohit Mehra (seasons 1–3): Poonam's ex-husband and Ananya's lover-turned-husband
 Mona Singh as Ananya Sharma (seasons 1–3): Rohit's lover, later his wife
 Gurdeep Kohli as Poonam Kapoor Mehra (seasons 1–3): Rohit's ex-wife and Abhimanyu's wife
 Pooja Banerjee as Bani Mehra (seasons 1–3): Rohit and Poonams' elder daughter
 Palak Jain as Nikki Mehra (seasons 1–3): Rohit and Poonam's younger daughter
 Apurva Agnihotri as Harry Somani (seasons 1–3): Ananya's boss
 Sandeep Nahar as Guri (seasons 1–3): Rohit's best friend
 Rani Jha as Vandy (seasons 1–3): Ananya's friend
 Manraj Singh as Arya (seasons 1–2): Bani's husband
 Parth Samthaan as Faizal Alghazi (Season 2): Bani's love interest
 Sayush Sanjay Nayyar as Abhimanyu (seasons 2–3): Poonam's second husband
 Suchitra Pillai as Sheena (seasons 1–3): Poonam's sister
 Aditi Vasudev as Amaira (Season 3): Ananya's half-sister
 Ivan Rodrigues as Paritosh (Season 3): Amaira's father
 Anjum Fakih as Nisha (Season 3)
 Sharon Prabhakar as Mrinalini (Season 3): Ananya and Amairas' mother

Episodes

Season 1

Season 2

Season 3

Release and reception

Release
The series went live on March 16, 2018, on the ALT Balaji app and its associated websites. It simultaneously went live on the Jio Cinema app.

Reception
Mid-Day gave the series 4.5 stars and said, "High on emotions, Kehne Ko Humsafar Hain has a relatable story where life is not only about kitchen politics, or hacking an over-imaginative plan to kill someone or weeping all the time."

Box Office India gave the show 4 stars and wrote, "Amid the regressive plots present in abundance in the Indian television industry, Kehne Ko Humsafar Hain gives a fresh story line, while talking about the reality of relationships and their conflicts. The struggle that the male protagonist faces to balance both aspects of his life with sensitivity promises to be interesting."

Zee News gave the series 4/5 stars, writing "The storyline of the show is for a mature audience as it delves into the complex relationship of a husband, wife and the other woman. The web series shows a sneak-peek of what the reality today one faces in selecting between society and himself!"

Awards

References

External links
 
 Kehne Ko Humsafar Hain on ZEE5
 Kehne Ko Humsafar Hain on ALTBalaji
Kehne Ko Humsafar Hain Season 2 on ALTBalaji
Kehne Ko Humsafar Hain Season 3 on ALTBalaji

2018 web series debuts
ALTBalaji original programming
Hindi-language web series
Indian drama web series
Rose Audio Visuals